Coryphidium is an extinct genus of acritarchs.

C. elegans is from the Tremadocian, the lower age of the Ordovocian of Morocco.

References

External links 

 
 Coryphidium (Unchecked) at AlgaeBase
 Coryphidium at fossiilid.info

Acritarch genera
Early Ordovician life